Léon Jean Goossens, CBE, FRCM (12 June 1897 – 13 February 1988) was an English oboist.

Career
Goossens was born in Liverpool, Lancashire, and studied at Liverpool College of Music and the Royal College of Music. His father was violinist and conductor Eugène Goossens, his brother the conductor and composer Eugene Aynsley Goossens and his sisters the harpists Marie and Sidonie Goossens.

During the early and middle parts of the 20th century, he was considered among the premier oboists in the world. He joined the Queen's Hall Orchestra (conducted by Henry Wood) at the age of 15 and was later (1932) engaged by Sir Thomas Beecham for the newly founded London Philharmonic Orchestra, but he also enjoyed a rich solo and chamber-music career. He became famous for a uniquely pleasing sound few other oboists could match. Oboists of the past had tended to be divided between the French school (elegant but thin and reedy in tone) and the German (full and rounded but rather clumsy, with little or no vibrato), but Goossens brought together the best qualities of both styles.

Goossens commissioned a number of works for the oboe from such distinguished composers as Sir Edward Elgar, Ralph Vaughan Williams and Rutland Boughton and collaborated extensively with other prominent soloists such as Yehudi Menuhin. Amongst his many pupils were the oboists Evelyn Barbirolli, Joy Boughton, daughter of Rutland Boughton and Peter Graeme, oboist of the Melos Ensemble.

He was appointed a Commander of the Order of the British Empire (CBE) in 1950 and made a Fellow of the Royal College of Music in 1962.

Works commissioned/dedicated to Léon Goossens
 Concerto for Oboe and Strings, Op. 39, Malcolm Arnold
 Oboe Quartet, Op. 61 (1957), Malcolm Arnold
 Sonatina for Oboe and Piano, Op. 28, Malcolm Arnold
 Quintet for Oboe and Strings, Arnold Bax
 Quintet for Oboe and Strings, Arthur Bliss
 Concerto No. 2 for Oboe and Strings in G, Rutland Boughton
 Sonata for Oboe and Piano, York Bowen
 Phantasy Quartet for oboe, violin, viola and cello, Benjamin Britten
 Sonata for Oboe and Piano, Arnold Cooke
 Three Pieces for Oboe and Piano, Thomas Dunhill
 Soliloquy for oboe, Edward Elgar
 Idyll for oboe and orchestra (1926), Harry Farjeon
 Interlude, Op. 21, for oboe and string quartet, Gerald Finzi
 Concerto, Op. 45, by his brother Eugene Goossens
 Parfums de Nuits, three miniatures for oboe and orchestra (1922), Hyam Greenbaum
 Sonata for Oboe and Piano, Herbert Howells
 Quartet for Oboe and Strings, Gordon Jacob
 French Suite for Oboe and Piano,  Alan Richardson
 Concerto in A minor for Oboe and Strings, Ralph Vaughan Williams

References

External links
From Oboe Classics
International Double Reed Society Article
British Double Reed Society

1897 births
1988 deaths
20th-century British male musicians
20th-century classical musicians
20th-century English musicians
Alumni of the Royal College of Music
Commanders of the Order of the British Empire
English classical oboists
English people of Belgian descent
Fellows of the Royal College of Music
Leon Goossens
Honorary Members of the Royal Philharmonic Society
Male oboists
Musicians from Liverpool
Musicians from Royal Tunbridge Wells
Musicians from Kent
People from Fulham